Tartu FC Merkuur is an Estonian amateur football club founded in 2013 and located in Tartu. The club currently plays in the II Liiga, the fourth tier of Estonian football. Their home ground since their formation has been Kambja Stadium.

History
Merkuur began playing in the Estonian football league system in 2013 season. Merkuur's debut in IV Liiga was a success, they earned promotion on the first attempt. In 2015, they were promoted again to the II Liiga.

Current squad
 ''As of 29 August 2016.

League and Cup

References

Football clubs in Estonia
Association football clubs established in 2013
2013 establishments in Estonia
Sport in Tartu